The 2020 PEI Scotties Tournament of Hearts Women's Championship, the women's provincial curling championship for Prince Edward Island, was held from January 8 to 12 at the Montague Curling Rink in Montague, Prince Edward Island. The winning Suzanne Birt rink represented Prince Edward Island at the 2020 Scotties Tournament of Hearts in Moose Jaw, Saskatchewan and finished with a 5–6 record. The event was held in conjunction with the 2020 PEI Tankard, the provincial men's championship.

Teams
The teams are listed as follows:

Knockout brackets

A event

B event

C event

Knockout results

Draw 2 
Wednesday, January 8, 2:00 pm

Draw 3 
Wednesday, January 8, 7:00 pm

Draw 4 
Thursday, January 9, 9:00 am

Draw 5 
Thursday, January 9, 2:00 pm

Draw 6 
Thursday, January 9, 7:00 pm

Draw 7 
Friday, January 10, 9:00 am

Draw 9 
Friday, January 10, 7:00 pm

Draw 11 
Saturday, January 11, 2:00 pm

Draw 12 
Saturday, January 11, 7:00 pm

Playoffs

Team Birt had to be beaten twice.

Semifinal
Sunday, January 12, 9:00 am

Final
Sunday, January 12, 2:00 pm

References

External links

Prince Edward Island
Curling competitions in Prince Edward Island
January 2020 sports events in Canada
2020 in Prince Edward Island
Montague, Prince Edward Island